Jijel Ferhat Abbas Airport , also known as Ferhat Abbas Airport, is an airport near Jijel, Algeria. Its name comes from the first president of Algerian National Assembly, Ferhat Abbas.

Airlines and destinations

References 

 
 OurAirports - Jijel

External links 
 Google Maps - Taher
Jijel Airport
 

Airports in Algeria
Buildings and structures in Jijel Province